The Noma Literary Prize (Noma Bungei Shō) was established in 1941 by the Noma Service Association (Noma Hōkō Kai) in accordance with the last wishes of Seiji Noma (1878–1938), founder and first president of the Kodansha publishing company. It is awarded by the Noma Cultural Foundation, the largest single shareholder in Kodansha. The Noma Literary Prize has been awarded annually to an outstanding new work published in Japan between October and the following September. The Noma Prize includes a commemorative plaque and a cash award of 3 million yen. It is one in a series of Noma Prizes.

Sponsorship Prize (1941–1946)

Noma Literary Prize (1941–present) 
An archive of past prize winners is maintained by Kodansha.

Noma Children's Literature Prize (1963–present)

Noma Children's Literature New Face Prize
This prize was last awarded in 1998.
09 1971 — Rie Yoshiyuki for Mahōtsukai no kushan neko (Sneezing Cat, a Magician).
33 1995 — Eto Mori for Uchu no Minashigo
34 1996 — Nahoko Uehashi for Moribito: Guardian of the Spirit

See also

 Noma Prize
 Noma Literacy Prize
 Noma Award for Publishing in Africa
 Noma Concours for Picture Book Illustrations

Notes

References
 Schierbeck, Sachiko Shibata, Marlene R. Edelstein (1994).  Japanese Women Novelists in the 20th Century: 104 Biographies, 1900-1993, Copenhagen: Museum Tusculanum Press. ; OCLC 32348453

External links
 J'Lit | Awards : Noma Prize for Literature | Books from Japan (Noma Literary Prize) 
 J'Lit | Awards : Noma Prize for New Writers | Books from Japan (Noma Literary New Face Prize)

Kodansha
1941 establishments in Japan
Japanese literary awards
Awards established in 1941
Awards established in 1979
Awards established in 1963
Fiction awards
Children's literary awards
First book awards
Noma Prize